The governor of the County of Machakos is the chief executive of the Kenya Devolved Government of Machakos County. The governor is the head of the executive branch of  County government of Machakos.

The current governor is Wavinya Ndeti, of Wiper Party. Wavinya Ndeti  is the second governor of the County.

References

Machakos County